Bisphenol F (BPF; 4,4′-dihydroxydiphenylmethane) is an organic compound with the chemical formula . It is structurally related to bisphenol A (BPA), a popular precursor for forming plastics, as both belong to the category of molecules known as bisphenols, which feature two phenol groups connected via a linking group. In BPF, the two aromatic rings are linked by a methylene connecting group. In response to concern about the health effects of BPA, BPF is increasingly used as a substitute for BPA.

Uses
BPF is used in the manufacture of plastics and epoxy resins. It is used in the production of tank and pipe linings, industrial flooring, road and bridge deck toppings, structural adhesives, grouts, coatings and electrical varnishes. BPF is also utilized in liners, lacquers, adhesives, plastics, and the coating of drinks and food cans. BPF is found in dental materials, such as restorative materials, liners, adhesives, oral prosthetic devices and tissue substitutes.

Biological effects

Pharmacokinetics 
BPF undergoes two primary phase II biotransformations to form the corresponding glucuronide and sulfate.

Hormonal Effects 
BPF has estrogenic, progesteronic, and anti-androgenic effects. The overarching implications of these hormonal changes for humans are decreases in testosterone secretions, especially in male testes, and increases in the activity of estrogen. The effects are greatest in the fetal testis, which is primed to be more easily affected due to its plasticity and massive period of growth. One study found that BPF had the same effect in lowering testosterone secretions as BPA, increasing over 80% compared to the control in the human fetal testes. It is important to note that this research is done using an in vitro method of fetal testis assay (FeTA), and does not necessarily reflect the mechanisms BPF would undergo if ingested by humans. For example, the ability for BPF to activate oestrogen in the receptors is lower than that of BPA, (one study suggests 5- to 10-fold lower) and the actions of these bisphenols are likely not directly through these receptors, but rather more indirect. As such, most research done on this topic has been using human cell line cultures, rather than studies on mammalian in vivo exposure. Several other reviews have all shown that BPF demonstrates similar endocrine and physiological disruptions as BPA, both in vitro and in vivo primary organoid cell cultures, especially demonstrating its estrogenic and anti-androgenic actions.

Environmental contamination
BPF is pervasive in the environment. Four out of five studies yielded results that BPF is estrogenic, androgenic and thyroidogenic. The greatest effect of BPF to be liver toxicity. In vitro studies of BPF showed effects of cytotoxicity, cellular dysfunction, DNA damage and chromosomal aberrations.

References

Bisphenols
Endocrine disruptors
Estrogens
Nonsteroidal antiandrogens
Bis(4-hydroxyphenyl)methanes